

Events

February events 
 February 9 – Minneapolis and St. Louis Railway purchases the Minneapolis, New Ulm and Southern.

March events 
 March 12 – Southern Railway in the United States inaugurates the Piedmont Limited passenger train service.
 March 15 – Marylebone Station, the new London terminus of the Great Central Railway, is opened.
 March – The first of Victoria's  narrow-gauge railways opens between Wangaratta and Whitfield.

April events 
 April 15 – Chicago's Lake Street 'L' is extended at grade level beyond the City Limits at 52nd Avenue and reaches Austin. On May 15, it is extended into suburban Oak Park.

June events 
 June 18 – Canadian Pacific Railway inaugurates the Imperial Limited passenger train between Montreal, Quebec, and Vancouver.

July events 
 July 17 – Hankaku Railroad Line, Osaka to Fukuchiyama route officially completed in Japan (as predecessor for JR Takarazuka Line and Fukuchiyama Line).
 July 21 – The Burgdorf–Thun railway in Switzerland becomes the first to operate with an alternating current electrification system, using a three-phase overhead at 750 V 40 Hz.
 July 23 – After successfully lobbying for a change in Canadian Federal regulations and a new city by-law to allow the service, the Ottawa Electric Railway begins Sunday operations.
 July 30 – The Terminal Railroad Association of St. Louis is formed to handle switching and transfer chores in St. Louis. The sponsoring railroads are the Missouri Pacific Railroad, Iron Mountain and Southern, Wabash Railroad, Ohio and Mississippi Railroad, Louisville and Nashville Railroad and the Cleveland, Cincinnati, Chicago and St. Louis Railroad.

August events
 August 8 – Atlantic Coast Line Railroad predecessor Atlantic Coast Line Railroad Company of South Carolina acquired from the Central of Georgia its half-interest in the lease of the Georgia Railroad; the ACL now had direct access to Atlanta.

September events
 September 18 
 The Gyeongin Line, predecessor Noryangjin to Jemulpo, and the first railway line built on the Korean Peninsula, opens.
 New Haven Railroad signs a deal with Sanderson & Porter, construction contractors, acquiring control of the People's Tramway in Connecticut.

October events 
 October 14 – North British Railway submits its proposal to absorb the Aberlady, Gullane and North Berwick Railway in Scotland by a stock exchange transaction.

November events
 November 8 – Jōbu Railway is founded in Japan.
 November 15 – The New York Central Railroad leases the Boston and Albany Railroad.

December events
 December 31 – Rail transport in Sudan: Desert railway from Wadi Halfa completed throughout to Khartoum by British military engineers on 1,067 mm (3 ft 6 in) gauge.

Unknown date events
 Maine Central Railroad Calais Branch is completed connecting Washington County, Maine to the United States rail network.
 William Cornelius Van Horne retires as president of Canadian Pacific Railway; he is succeeded by Thomas George Shaughnessy.
 Alexander J. Cassatt becomes president of the Pennsylvania Railroad.
 American Car and Foundry is formed from the merger of 13 smaller rolling stock manufacturers across the United States.
 Southern Car and Foundry, later to become part of American Car and Foundry, is founded in Memphis, Tennessee.
 Niagara, St. Catharines and Toronto Railway is formed in Ontario, Canada, by reorganization of the St. Catharines and Niagara Central Railway.
 Establishment in London, England, of The Railway Club, the oldest society in the world for railway enthusiasts.
 William Truesdale becomes president of the Lackawanna Railroad, and initiates a bold plan to upgrade the road's facilities.

Births

January births 
 January 15 – Robert Stetson Macfarlane, president of Northern Pacific Railway 1951–1966, is born.

Unknown date births
 John W. Barriger III, president of the Monon Railroad 1946–1953, Pittsburgh and Lake Erie Railroad 1954–1964, Missouri–Kansas–Texas Railroad 1965–1970 and the Boston and Maine Railroad 1973–1974 (died 1976).

Deaths

September deaths
 September 12 – Cornelius Vanderbilt II, president of the New York Central system (born 1843).

References
 White, John H., Jr. (Spring 1986), America's most noteworthy railroaders, Railroad History, Railway and Locomotive Historical Society, 154, p. 9–15.